The 1894 Boston mayoral election occurred on Tuesday, December 11, 1894. Republican candidate Edwin Upton Curtis defeated Democratic candidate Francis Peabody Jr., and two other contenders, to win election as Mayor of Boston.

This was the last Boston mayoral election for a one-year term; the city charter was changed in June 1895, increasing the mayoral term to two years.

Curtis was inaugurated on Monday, January 7, 1895.

Candidates
 Edwin Upton Curtis (Republican), former City Clerk of Boston (1889–1890)
 Phinehas P. Field (Populist)
 Abijah Hall (Prohibition)
 Francis Peabody Jr. (Democrat), attorney

Results

See also
List of mayors of Boston, Massachusetts

References

Further reading

External links
 Boston Mayor Race - Dec 11, 1894 at ourcampaigns.com

1894
Boston
Boston mayoral
19th century in Boston